Patuakhali Sadar is an upazila of Patuakhali District in the Division of Barisal, Bangladesh.

Geography
It has 55,194 households and a total area of 362.62 km2.

Demographics
According to the 1991 Bangladesh census, Patuakhali Sadar had a population of 306,517. Males constituted 50.12% of the population, and females 49.88%. The population aged 18 or over was 152,588. Patuakhali Sadar had an average literacy rate of 42.6% (7+ years), compared to the national average of 32.4%.

Administration
Patuakhali Sadar Upazila is divided into Patuakhali Municipality and 12 union parishads: Auliapur, Badarpur, Boro Bighai, Choto Bighai, Itbaria, Jainkathi, Kalikapur, Kamalapur, Laukathi, Lohalia, Madarbunia, and Marichbunia. The union parishads are subdivided into 101 mauzas and 124 villages.

Patuakhali Municipality is subdivided into 9 wards and 29 mahallas.

The chairman of shodor upozila chairman Md. Golam Sarowar.

See also
Upazilas of Bangladesh
Districts of Bangladesh
Divisions of Bangladesh

References

Upazilas of Patuakhali District